Dahi chutney is strained dahi that is mixed into a chutney of mint and onions, originating from the Indian subcontinent. It is popular in South India and is a side dish along with mirchi ka salan for the popular Hyderabadi biryani.

Ingredients
The traditional ingredients are dahi, onions, tomatoes, mint leaves, coriander, chilli peppers, and salt to taste.

Preparations
There are multiple ways to prepare the side dish. Mint, coriander, and a chilli pepper is cut and mixed into yogurt which is then blended in a blender for a minute. Another way is to simply mix diced onions with salt and coriander into a bowl of fresh yogurt and serve as is.

Perugu pachadi
Perugu pachadi is Southern Indian regional variant of curd chutney. It is also a yogurt-based dip that includes vegetables such as tomato, cucumbers, squash, mango, bitter gourd either raw or cooked.

This variety is popular in coastal Andhra Pradesh. In Northern India, it would be called raita.

Varieties include:
 Tomato perugu pachadi
 Snake gourd peguru pachadi
 Coconut Perugu Pachadi
 Okra Perugu Pachadi

See also

 Kadhi
 List of chutneys
 List of yogurt-based dishes and beverages
 Raita

References

Further reading

Pakistani cuisine
Hyderabadi cuisine
Muhajir cuisine
Indian condiments
Pakistani condiments
Yogurt-based dishes
Chutney
Bangladeshi condiments